Onur Rüzgar Erkoçlar (formerly Nil Erkoçlar; born 26 March 1986) is a Turkish former actor and model.

Erkoçlar debuted with TV adverts as a child. In 2002, he achieved national recognition after an advert of Molped, a sanitary napkin brand. After the advert's popularity, he started to play in the series such as Seni Yaşatacağım, Bütün Çocuklarım, and Emret Komutanım.

In February 2013, Erkoçlar came out as a trans man and debuted his new image and name "Rüzgar" (meaning wind).

Filmography

References

External links
 

1986 births
Living people
Turkish male television actors
21st-century Turkish male actors
Transgender male actors
Turkish transgender people
Turkish LGBT actors
Transgender male models
21st-century Turkish LGBT people